Signal transducing adapter molecule 2 is a protein that in humans is encoded by the STAM2 gene.

Function 

The protein encoded by this gene is closely related to STAM, an adaptor protein involved in the downstream signaling of cytokine receptors, both of which contain a SH3 domain and the immunoreceptor tyrosine-based activation motif (ITAM). Similar to STAM, this protein acts downstream of JAK kinases, and is phosphorylated in response to cytokine stimulation. This protein and STAM thus are thought to exhibit compensatory effects on the signaling pathway downstream of JAK kinases upon cytokine stimulation.

Interactions 

STAM2 has been shown to interact with HGS, Janus kinase 1 and USP8.

References

Further reading

External links